Sanaa regalis is a species of insect in the bush-cricket or katydid family, Tettigoniidae, found in the Himalayas. It was first described in 1895 by Carl Brunner von Wattenwyl as Termera regalis.

References

Pseudophyllinae
regalis
Orthoptera of Asia
Insects described in 1895
Taxa named by Carl Brunner von Wattenwyl